Ceja may refer to:

People 
Ceja is a Spanish-language surname. People with the surname include:
 Julio Ceja (disambiguation), various people
 MC Ceja (born 1978), Puerto Rican hip hop singer and composer also known as El Cejón
 Ramón Ceja Romero (born 1969), Mexican politician affiliated with the National Action Party
 Víctor Manuel Báez Ceja (born 1959), Mexican politician in the National Regeneration Movement (Morena) party
 Israel Madrigal Ceja (born 1975), Mexican politician from the Party of the Democratic Revolution
 Ramón Michel Navarro Ceja (Ramón Navarro; born 1998), professional Mexican footballer

Other uses 
 Ceja Canchal
 Ceja Vineyards, a family-owned winery in Napa founded by Mexican-American immigrants
 Ceja ray
 Conseil Européen des Jeunes Agriculteurs (CEJA), agricultural organization in Europe

See also 
 La Ceja (disambiguation)
 Cejas (disambiguation)